Albirex Niigata Ladies is a women's football club based in Niigata and affiliated with Albirex Niigata, founded in 2002. The team currently plays in the WE League, the highest division of women's football in Japan.

Kits

Kit suppliers and shirt sponsors

Staff

Managerial history

Players

Current squad

Honours

Domestic competitions
Empress's Cup
Runners-up (4): 2011, 2013, 2015, 2016

Season-by-season records

See also
Japan Football Association (JFA)
List of women's football clubs in Japan
2022–23 in Japanese football

References

External links
 Official website

Women's football clubs in Japan
Association football clubs established in 2002
2002 establishments in Japan
Albirex Niigata
Japan Women's Football League teams
Sports teams in Niigata Prefecture
WE League clubs